Merpati Stadium is a football stadium in the city of Depok, West Java, Indonesia. The stadium has a capacity of 10,000 people.
It is the home base of Persikad Depok.

Tournament

References

Sports venues in West Java
Football venues in West Java
Multi-purpose stadiums in West Java
Sports venues in Depok
Football venues in Depok
Multi-purpose stadiums in Depok
Buildings and structures in Depok
Buildings and structures in West Java